Victor François de Montchenu (6 November 1764, in Bougé-Chambalud – 12 January 1849, in Paris) was a French soldier.

Life
Victor François de Montchenu came from one of the oldest families in the Dauphiné, and one long devoted to military service. He was admitted to the Ecole des chevaux-légers as a child and in 1775 became sous-lieutenant of the régiment d'infanterie du Roi (King's Infantry Regiment), at a time when officer ranks were reserved for sons of the noble families. He was a captain in this corps during the Nancy affair, finding himself beside André Désilles when the latter died by throwing himself in front of a cannon in a vain hope of stopping the battle between the mutineers and the troops of de Bouillé.

Consistently monarchist, Montchenu quickly decided in 1792 that the royalist cause was irrevocably separated from the nation's cause and left France to join the armée des Princes, serving in it as aide-de-camp to général Livarot. In March 1793 he assisted in the defence of Maestricht against Charles François Dumouriez's force and served as an aide-major in the 1794-95 campaigns in the régiment de Broglie in the pay of England.

Returning to France on the peace of 1814, Montchenu was made a croix de Saint-Louis on 13 August that year and was made brevet maréchal de camp on 30 December. His elder brother was sent to Saint Helena in 1815 as commissioner of the French government to keep an eye on the behaviour of Napoleon. Under the Bourbon Restoration the younger Montchenu worked as inspector general of the infantry. He became a Knight (18 May 1820) then an Officer (1 May 1821) of the Légion d'honneur. His active career ceased after the July Revolution and he was allowed to retire in February 1835.

Sources 

1764 births
1849 deaths
People from Isère
Military leaders of the French Revolutionary Wars
Royalist insurgents during the French Revolution
People of the Bourbon Restoration
Chevaliers of the Légion d'honneur
Officiers of the Légion d'honneur